Existentialism Is a Humanism is a 1946 work by the philosopher Jean-Paul Sartre, based on a lecture by the same name he gave at Club Maintenant in Paris, on 29 October 1945. In early translations, Existentialism and Humanism was the title used in the United Kingdom; the work was originally published in the United States as Existentialism, and a later translation employs the original title.

Summary

Sartre asserts that the key defining concept of existentialism is that the existence of a person is prior to their essence or "existence precedes essence". 

Thus, Sartre rejects what he calls "deterministic excuses" and claims that people must take responsibility for their behavior. Sartre defines anguish as the emotion that people feel once they realize that they are responsible not just for themselves, but for all humanity. Anguish leads people to realize that their actions guide humanity and allows them to make judgments about others based on their attitude towards freedom. Nevertheless, "It is not the will that gives value to the possibility. Valuation depends on me, that’s true, but not on my will. It depends on my project, that is to say, on how I perceive the world, how I experience it." Anguish is also associated with Sartre's notion of despair, which he defines as optimistic reliance on a set of possibilities that make action possible. Sartre claims that "In fashioning myself, I fashion Man.", saying that the individual's action will affect and shape mankind. The being-for-itself uses despair to embrace freedom and take meaningful action in full acceptance of whatever consequences may arise as a result. He also describes abandonment as the loneliness that atheists feel when they realize that there is no God to prescribe a way of life, no guidance for people on how to live; that we're abandoned in the sense of being alone in the universe and the arbiters of our own essence. "There is a contingency of human existence. It is a condemnation of their being. Their being is not determined, so it is up to everyone to create their own existence, for which they are then responsible. They cannot not be free, there is a form of necessity for freedom, which can never be given up." Sartre closes his work by emphasizing that existentialism, as it is a philosophy of action and one's defining oneself, is optimistic and liberating. "Sartre offers a description of human beings as a project and as a commitment."

Publication history
First published in French in 1946, Existentialism and Humanism was published in an English translation by Philip Mairet in 1948. In the United States, the work was originally published as Existentialism. The work has also been published in German translation. An English translation by Carol Macomber, with an introduction by the sociologist Annie Cohen-Solal and notes and preface by Arlette Elkaïm-Sartre, was published under the title Existentialism Is a Humanism in 2007.

Reception
Existentialism Is a Humanism has been "a popular starting-point in discussions of existentialist thought," and in the philosopher Thomas Baldwin's words, "Seized the imagination of a generation." However, Sartre himself later rejected some of the views he expressed in the work, and regretted its publication. Other philosophers have critiqued the lecture on various grounds: Martin Heidegger wrote in a letter to the philosopher and Germanist Jean Beaufret that while Sartre's statement that "existence precedes essence" reverses the metaphysical statement that essence precedes existence, "The reversal of a metaphysical statement remains a metaphysical statement." In Heidegger's view, Sartre "Stays with metaphysics in oblivion of the truth of Being.". Heidegger reportedly told Hubert Dreyfus that Sartre's work was "dreck." Marjorie Grene found Sartre's discussion of "the problem of the relation between individuals" in Existentialism and Humanism to be weaker than the one he had previously offered in Being and Nothingness (1943). Walter Kaufmann commented that the lecture "has been widely mistaken for the definitive statement of existentialism," but is rather "a brilliant lecture which bears the stamp of the moment." According to Kaufmann, Sartre makes factual errors, including misidentifying philosopher Karl Jaspers as a Catholic, and presenting a definition of existentialism that is open to question. Thomas C. Anderson criticized Sartre for asserting without explanation that if a person seeks freedom from false, external authorities, then he or she must invariably allow this freedom for others. Iris Murdoch found one of Sartre's discussions with a Marxist interesting, but otherwise considered Existentialism and Humanism to be "a rather bad little book." Mary Warnock believed Sartre was right to dismiss the work.

The philosopher Frederick Copleston stated that Sartre, like Georg Wilhelm Friedrich Hegel and Edmund Husserl, interpreted the views of René Descartes as an anticipation of his own philosophical views. The neurobiologist Steven Rose described a statement in which Sartre maintained that man "will be what he makes of himself" as a "windily rhetorical paean to the dignity of universalistic man" and "more an exercise in political sloganeering than a sustainable philosophical position." He pointed to aging and disease as examples of factors that limit human freedom. The philosopher Slavoj Žižek argued that there is a parallel between Sartre's views and claims made by the character Father Zosima in Fyodor Dostoyevsky's novel The Brothers Karamazov (1880): whereas Sartre believes that with total freedom comes total responsibility, for Father Zosima "each of us must make us responsible for all men's sins".

References

Bibliography
Books

 
 
 
 
 
 
 
 
 
 
 
 
 

 Articles

External links
 L'existentialisme est un Humanisme (archive) Comments and French text of the lecture
 Full version of "Existentialism Is a Humanism" lecture
 A guide to understand Jean Paul Sartre's Existentialism is a Humanism, an article of Yoann Malinge - [Literary Encyclopedia]
 A student’s guide to Jean-Paul Sartre’s Existentialism and Humanism - Philosophy Now

1946 non-fiction books
Books by Jean-Paul Sartre
Existentialist books
French non-fiction books
Humanist literature